Quri Chay may refer to:
 Quri Chay, Golestan
 Quri Chay, Kermanshah
 Quri Chay, Baneh, Kurdistan Province
 Quri Chay, Bijar, Kurdistan Province
 Quri Chay, Dehgolan, Kurdistan Province
 Quri Chay, West Azerbaijan
 Quri Chay Rural District
 Quri Chay-ye Gharbi Rural District
 Quri Chay-ye Sharqi Rural District